Psaphida thaxteriana is a moth of the family Noctuidae first described by Augustus Radcliffe Grote in 1874. It is found in the eastern parts of North America, including Tennessee and Maryland.

The larvae feed on Quercus species.

References

Moths of Maryland

Psaphida
Moths of North America
Moths described in 1874